The Seven Third Summits are the third-highest mountains of each of the seven continents. All of these mountain peaks are separate peaks rather than a sub-peak of the continents' high point. Christian Stangl from Austria claims to be the first person to reach the summit of all seven third summit mountains after climbing Puncak Mandala and Puncak Trikora. He did this as a part of his "Triple Seven Summits" project. Because of glacial melting and the disagreement over exactly which three peaks are the tallest in the Australian continent, Stangl also climbed several additional candidate peaks including Sumantri and Ngga Pulu.

Definitions
The definition of continent is a matter of some dispute among mountaineers seeking to complete this challenge.

The main ridge of the Greater Caucasus range is generally considered to form the boundary between Asia and Europe. In that case, Mount Elbrus and Dykh-Tau, are the two highest mountains in Europe. Excluding the Caucasus Mountains, Mont Blanc and Monte Rosa would be Europe's two highest mountains.

The Australian continent is defined as comprising the mainland of Australia and proximate islands on the same continental shelf, including Tasmania and New Guinea. In the convention of the seven continents, one of the continents is the region of Australasia, which includes for example the mountainous islands of New Zealand. For both the geological and conventional continent, New Guinea's Puncak Jaya / Carstensz Pyramid and Puncak Mandala are the two highest summits. When considering a continent as a continuous landmass surrounded by oceans, mainland Australia would be its own continent, with Mount Kosciuszko and Mount Townsend as its two highest summits.

Bass and Messner list
The Third Seven Summits list follows the Seven Summits list created by Richard Bass, who chose the highest mountain of mainland Australia, Mount Kosciuszko, to represent the Australian continent's highest summit. Reinhold Messner proposed another list (the Messner or Carstensz list) replacing Mount Kosciuszko with Western New Guinea's Puncak Jaya, which is part of Indonesia.

Following the Bass list, Mount Twynam is the third-highest summit in Australia. According to the Messner list, Puncak Trikora (4,750 m) on New Guinea is the third-highest of the Australian continent. However, SRTM data do support Puncak Mandala being taller than Puncak Trikora. Heights of mountain peaks in West Papua are poorly established.

Both lists consider the Caucasus Mountains as European. This makes Shkhara, located on the border between Georgia and Russia, the third-highest summit in Europe. Those who exclude the Caucasus Mountains from Europe, regard the Dom, located in Switzerland, as Europe's third-highest summit.

See also 
 Seven Summits
 Seven Second Summits
 Volcanic Seven Summits
 Three Poles Challenge
 Explorers Grand Slam, also known as The Adventurers Grand Slam
 Eight-thousander

References

External links 
Peak Bagger
Climbing Carstensz Pyramid, Papua Indonesia

 
.03
Seven 03